Felix Manz (also Felix Mantz) (c. 1498 – 5 January 1527) was an Anabaptist, a co-founder of the original Swiss Brethren congregation in Zürich, Switzerland, and the first martyr of the Radical Reformation.

Birth and life

Manz was born and died in Zürich, in the Old Swiss Confederacy, where his father was a canon of Grossmünster church. Though records of his education are scant, there is evidence that he had a liberal education, with a thorough knowledge of Hebrew, Greek and Latin. Manz became a follower of Huldrych Zwingli after he came to Zürich in 1519. When Conrad Grebel joined the group in 1521, he and Manz became friends. They questioned the mass, the nature of church and state connections, and infant baptism. After the Second Disputation of Zürich in 1523, they became dissatisfied, believing that Zwingli's plans for reform had been compromised with the city council.

Grebel, Manz and others made several attempts to plead their position. Several parents refused to have their children baptized. A public disputation was held with Zwingli on 17 January 1525. The council declared Zwingli the victor.

After the final rebuff by the city council on 18 January, in which they were ordered to desist from arguing and submit to the decision of the council, and have their children baptized within eight days, the brethren gathered at the home of Felix Manz and his mother on 21 January. Conrad Grebel baptized George Blaurock, and Blaurock in turn baptized the others. This made complete the break with Zwingli and the council, and formed the first church of the Radical Reformation. The movement spread rapidly, and Manz was very active in it. He used his language skills to translate his texts into the language of the people, and worked enthusiastically as an evangelist. Manz was arrested on a number of occasions between 1525 and 1527. While he was preaching with George Blaurock in the Grüningen region, they were taken by surprise, arrested and imprisoned in Zürich at the Wellenburg prison.

Execution

On 7 March 1526, the Zürich council had passed an edict that made adult re-baptism punishable by drowning. On 5 January 1527, Manz became the first casualty of the edict, and the first Swiss Anabaptist to be martyred at the hands of magisterial Protestants. While Manz stated that he wished "to bring together those who were willing to accept Christ, obey the Word, and follow in His footsteps, to unite with these by baptism, and to purchase the rest in their present conviction", Zwingli and the council accused him of obstinately refusing "to recede from his error and caprice". At 3:00 p.m., as he was led from the Wellenburg to a boat, he praised God and preached to the people. A Reformed minister went along, seeking to silence him, and hoping to give him an opportunity to recant. Manz's brother and mother encouraged him to stand firm and suffer for Jesus' sake. He was taken by boat onto the River Limmat. His hands were bound and pulled behind his knees and a pole was placed between them. He was executed by drowning in Lake Zürich on the Limmat. His alleged last words were, "Into thy hands, O God, I commend my spirit." His property was confiscated by government of Zürich, and he was buried in the St. Jakobs cemetery. Manz's execution predates the Münster Rebellion which officially began in 1534.

Manz left written testimony of his faith, an eighteen-stanza hymn, and was apparently the author of Protestation und Schutzschrift (a defense of Anabaptism presented to the Zürich council).

Legacy 
The witness of Felix Manz' life and the other radical Anabaptist continues to be a source of inspiration to Christians today. The Amish, Baptist, Mennonite and Bruderhof churches all are influenced to varying degrees by the Manz and the other Reformation-era Anabaptists.

Hymn
An 18-stanza hymn by Manz has been preserved and is found in the Ausbund, a 16th-century hymn book still used by the Amish. It is a hymn of praise to God for his great salvation. The seven lines of the first stanza are found below.

Notes

References
 A History of the Baptists, by Thomas Armitage 
 Leben und Sterben des Zürcher Täuferführers, Felix Mantz, by Ekkehard Trajewski (Estep and others call this the "definitive work" on Felix Manz.)
 Mennonite Encyclopedia, Harold S. Bender, Cornelius J. Dyck, Dennis D. Martin, Henry C. Smith, et al., editors 
 The Anabaptist Story, by William R. Estep 
 The Anabaptist Vision, by Harold S. Bender 
 The Bloody Theater or Martyrs Mirror, by Thieleman J. van Braght 
 The Reformers and their Stepchildren, by Leonard Verduin

External links

 Manz, Felix (ca. 1498–1527) at Global Anabaptist Mennonite Encyclopedia Online
 Anabaptist reconciliation with Reformed Church in Zurich to bring healing, hope

Swiss Christian religious leaders
People from Zürich
16th-century Swiss people
1490s births
1527 deaths
16th-century Christian mystics
Swiss Anabaptists
Executed Swiss people
People executed by Switzerland
People executed by drowning
People executed for heresy
16th-century Protestant martyrs
Anabaptism
Protestant mystics
Christian radicals
16th-century Anabaptist ministers